Verbascum litigiosum is a species of mullein in the figwort family Scrophulariaceae, endemic to coastal Portugal. It inhabits coastal sands in secondary dunes, preferably in coastal areas close to limestone regions.

References

litigiosum
Endemic flora of Portugal
Endemic flora of the Iberian Peninsula
Plants described in 1913